Lily Simkin (born 9 September 2003) is an English footballer who plays as a midfielder for Birmingham City of the FA WSL.

Club career

Birmingham City
Simkin began playing football at local club Wyrley Juniors, a sister club of Birmingham City. She first joined the Wildcats program at the age of five before joining the boys' team. At the age of ten she joined the Birmingham City RTC.

On 17 November 2019, Simkin made her senior first-team debut at the age of 16 as 62nd-minute substitute for Freya Gregory in a 3–0 WSL defeat away to Brighton & Hove Albion. She started the next match, a 6–0 defeat to eventual league champions Chelsea. Simkin made a total of six appearances during the 2019–20 season before it was curtailed due to the coronavirus pandemic.

International career
Simkin has been capped by England at under-17 level.

Personal life
Simkin is the daughter of former professional footballer Darren Simkin who played in the Football League for Wolverhampton Wanderers and Shrewsbury Town during the 1990s.

Career statistics

Club 
.

References

External links 

 Lily Simkin at Birmingham City
 

Living people
2003 births
Women's association football midfielders
English women's footballers
Birmingham City W.F.C. players
Women's Super League players